, near Bickenhill, Solihull, England, is the principal Gaelic games sports facility in the West Midlands. It is administered by the Warwickshire GAA.  is located east of Birmingham near Birmingham International Airport. It is currently the home grounds of Britain GAA.

Facilities
 consists of three full-size Gaelic Athletic Association pitches with eight changing rooms, bar area and car-parking.

The address is: Pairc Na hÉireann, Catherine de Barnes Lane, Solihull, B92 0DB.

Use
 has hosted numerous Warwickshire Gaelic football and hurling matches as well as the provincial knockout championships and the British University Gaelic football Championships. Most recently, with the entry of Warwickshire's hurling team into the Lory Meagher Cup and the Leinster Junior Shield, it also regularly hosts hurling teams from Ireland. The future of the ground was in question due to plans to drive a motorway through its middle.

References

External links
 Warwickshire  G.A.A. Old link
 Warwickshire  G.A.A.

Gaelic games grounds in England
Solihull
Sports venues in the West Midlands (county)
British GAA